Wulidian  is a station on Line 6,  Line 9, and the Loop line of Chongqing Rail Transit in Chongqing Municipality, China. It is located in the Jiangbei District. It opened in 2012.

Station structure

Line 6 and Loop line

Line 9

Gallery

References

Jiangbei District, Chongqing
Railway stations in Chongqing
Railway stations in China opened in 2012
Chongqing Rail Transit stations